Räpina paisjärv is a lake in Räpina Parish, in the district of Polva in Estonia. It is in the southeast of the country close to the border with Russia.

See also
List of lakes of Estonia

Reservoirs in Estonia
Räpina
Lakes of Põlva County